Hoërskool Diamantveld is a public Afrikaans medium co-educational high school in Kimberley in the Northern Cape province of South Africa and the oldest Afrikaans school in Kimberley.

Beginnings
It was founded on 28 January 1935 on the then closed Kimberley Teachers Training College hostels’ premises, and the first Head Master was Dr. O’Grady. It was first called Kimberley High School but in 1936 it changed to Diamantveld. Reverend Albertyn, J.R. headed the campaign to have an Afrikaans school established.

Head Masters to follow
Dr. O’Grady stayed on until 1960. While he was headmaster the school relocated to the premises of Belgravia Primary School. The head masters that followed him was: Cerff, C.F. (1960–1969), Spangenberg, J.P. (1969–1974), Heyns, M.G. (1974–1979), Auret, J.P. (1979–1996), du Toit, J.(1996–2012) and then Hugo, M. The current head master is Victor, L.

Motto
A posse ad esse (in Latin).Translated: Making a possibility, a reality

Gender and language
The school is a co-ed school in Afrikaans only.

Hostels
Two hostels exist, namely J.P. Auret House and Dugmore House.

School Performances
The school had the best matric results in the Northern Cape Province in 2016.
Diamantveld won the International AQUALIBRIUM Schools Water Competition in 2015 held in Johannesburg, South Africa. It is an engineering, mathematics and science competition. In 2015 the school had to design a water model for a water distribution network.

International Partnership

The school was in a partnership with PASCH Schulen, a world-wide German school group in 2010 when South Africa presented the Soccer World Cup. The partnership entailed learning German as a third or fourth language while encouraging them to play soccer. This was aimed at both boys and girls.

Sport

The Wilde Klawer National Tournament, which brings together South Africa's top performing high schools in rugby and netball is hosted at the school since 2014. The school’s rugby fields is of a standard that provincial rugby can be played on. It is the only other pitch in the region that is of an acceptable standard. The main stadium is Griqua Park. Griquas, the region’s senior rugby team, therefore play a few provincial games per season on the school’s rugby fields. The region from which Griquas draw players is called the Northern Cape. (one of South Africa’s nine provinces)

Alumni

Coenie Burger, Moderator of the Dutch Reformed Church
Andries Thomas Markgraaff, ex-Springbok rugby coach and provincial player (position lock)
Karen Muir, matriculated in 1970, ex world record holder in swimming.
Philippus Jeremia Rudolf Steyn, Proteas cricket opening batsman
Edwill van Aarde, radio and television presenter. He matriculated in 1957
Flippie van der Merwe, Springbok rugby player in 1981 (position prop)

Individual performances

 Alecia Brits - international science pupil.
LM Joubert  -  first 16 year old rugby referee to be in charge of senior provincial rugby game.
Lourens van Niekerk -  winner of the countrywide Mathematics Olympia in 2012

High Court Case

The school took an application to the High Court of South Africa (Northern Cape Division) in 2004. The Head of the Department of Education (HOD) was the respondent. Diamantveld wanted to appoint teachers from outside the province, but the HOD overruled it. Judges Majiedt, J. and Tlaletsi, J. ruled against the school and in favour of the Department of Education. This created a precedent in South African law.

References

Schools in the Northern Cape
High schools in South Africa